The Old Bank of England is a public house at 194 Fleet Street, where the City of London meets the City of Westminster.

It was constructed on a corner site in 1886 by Sir Arthur Blomfield in a grand Italianate style, the interior having three large chandeliers with a detailed plaster ceiling. It is a Grade II listed building.

The building was occupied by the Law Courts branch of the Bank of England from 1888 to 1975 before it was refurbished and put to its current use in 1994. The vaults beneath the pub once contained gold bullion, and are said to have held the Crown Jewels for a period as well. The pub is close to where the fictional Sweeney Todd is said to have plied his trade.

The pub is currently operated by McMullen's Brewery.

See also
 List of pubs in London

References

External links
The Old Bank of England website

Grade II listed pubs in the City of Westminster